Unspeakable: The Tulsa Race Massacre is a picture book written by Carole Boston Weatherford and illustrated by Floyd Cooper. Published on February 2, 2021, by Carolrhoda, it tells the history behind the Tulsa race massacre in verse.

The book was praised by critics, receiving several starred reviews, and was the recipient of a Caldecott Honor and the Coretta Scott King Award in both the author and illustrator categories.

Reception 
Eboni Njoku, writing for The Horn Book Magazine, commented on how Weatherford took "[g]reat care" to describe the community that lived in what was known as the "Black Wall Street" and praised the "[s]mall details" present in the writing, which "add to the authenticity of the narrative". Njoku also praised Cooper's illustrations, due to "the sepia-toned images resembling historical photographs." A review published in The School Library Journal further adds that the "illustrations are infused with a personal connection", as Cooper's grandfather would tell him stories about the Tulsa race massacre.

Publishers Weekly highlighted the fact the book focuses not only on "the attack, but also on the positive achievements of the Black business owners, lawyers, and doctors". Kirkus Reviews called Unspeakable a "somber, well-executed addition to the history as the incident approaches its 100th anniversary."

Unspeakable was recognized with a Caldecott Honor for its illustrations and the Coretta Scott King Award was given to both Weatherford and Cooper. The book was also a Sibert Medal Honor and was longlisted for the National Book Awards.

References 

2021 children's books
American picture books
Caldecott Honor-winning works
Children's books about race and ethnicity
Coretta Scott King Award-winning works
Works about the Tulsa race massacre